The Lungleng river, also known as the Lungleng Lui,  is a river of Mizoram, northeastern India. It flows in a southerly direction towards Myanmar.

Etymology
The Lungleng river gets its name from the Lung Leng tribe of people, who are sedentary river-dwelling agriculturist people.

Lungleng Hydroelectric Project, Aizawl
The Lungleng Hydroelectric Project is located in Aizawl district of Mizoram which helps in utilization of the waters of the Tyao river. It generates power as a storage type development, harnessing a gross head of about 137 m. The dam site is approachable from Lungleng which is 25 km from Aizawl. The Tyao river is also known as Tlawng or Dhaleswari or Katakha which is a tributary of River Kaladan from Burma. It is an important, very useful and the longest river in the state of Mizoram. Tlawng River passes through the Aizawl District and it flanks the western side of Aizawl City.

Kaladan river route
This river is also part of the Kaladan Multi-modal Transit Transport Project.

See also
 East-West Industrial Corridor Highway, Arunachal Pradesh
 Arunachal Border Highway
 Asian Highway Network
 India-Myanmar-Thailand Friendship Highway

References

External links
 Lungleng Hydroelectric Project Report

Rivers of Mizoram
Chin State
Rakhine State
Rivers of Myanmar
Rivers of India